Ford Aerospace was the aerospace and defense division of Ford Motor Company. It was based in Dearborn, Michigan and was active from 1956 (originally as Philco and then Philco Ford) through 1990, when it was sold to the Loral Corporation. Major divisions were located in Palo Alto CA (Space Systems Division), San Jose CA (Western Development Laboratories) and Newport Beach (Aeronutronic Division). Other operations were located in a number of other states around the United States.

History
The company was established in 1956. It was renamed to "Ford Aerospace and Communications Corporation" in 1976, and then to "Ford Aerospace Corporation" in 1988.

The  Engineering and Research Center campus was located on Jamboree Road at Ford Road, overlooking the Santa Catalina Strait of the Pacific Ocean in Newport Beach.  The facility's  master plan and main buildings were designed by Modernist architect William Pereira in 1958. Operation was moved to Newport Beach in 1960.

In the 1960s and 1970s, business enjoyed rapid growth because of the success of the Sidewinder air-to-air missile and Chaparral surface-to-air missile programs. In the 1970s, the Pave Tack bomb-targeting system became a significant contributor to revenue.

The company included:  Space Systems Division (later Space Systems/Loral) and the Western Development Labs (WDL) (later Loral WDL, and presently Lockheed Martin WDL) in Palo Alto, California with Aeronutronic (later Space Systems/Loral) at the Newport Beach site.

Company timeline

A partial company timeline includes:
1956 Aeronutronic becomes a Ford Motor Company division.
1961 Ford Motor Company acquires Philco Corporation, later named Philco-Ford Corporation.
1963 Ford Motor Company folds Aeronutronic into Philco, strengthening Ford Motor Company's overall participation in space and defense markets.
1975 Philco-Ford becomes Aeronutronic Ford Corporation
1976 Aeronutronic Ford Corporation becomes Ford Aerospace & Communications Corporation.
1981 FACC starts new sister division to Aeroneutronics in Southern California named DIVAD (Division Air Defense) for the production of the M247 Sgt. York armor tracked vehicle (named in honor of legendary World War I sharpshooter and medal of honor recipient Sergeant Alvin York) which incorporated F-16 search-and-track radar directed twin 40 mm Bofors gun systems in Newport Beach and Lake Forest, CA. Divad division dissolved in 1984 when Defense Secretary Caspar Weinberger canceled the production contract and all existing Sgt.York units were dismantled for scrap. (D.V. Barker)
1988 Ford Aerospace San Jose CA location working on NATO Airbase SATCOM (NABS) Skynet control facilities
1990 Ford Aerospace sold to Loral Corporation. The sale did not include the lease of land for the Newport Beach plant that the buyer was required to vacate within five years.

Products
AGM-88 HARM (subcontractor)
AIM-9 Sidewinder
AN/AAS-38 (F/A-18 FLIR)
Have Dash
LGM-118 Peacekeeper (subcontractor)
LGM-30 Minuteman (subcontractor)
MGM-51 Shillelagh
MIM-72 Chaparral
Pave Knife
Pave Tack
UGM-73 Poseidon (subcontractor)
Trident (missile) (subcontractor)

See also

References

External links
University of California Irvine Library, Online Archives: "Aerial view of Ford Aeronutronics Plant in 1960"
 Flickr.com: "Aerial view  of Ford Ford Aerospace & Communications & Newport Beach c.1983

Ford Motor Company
Aerospace companies of the United States
Defense companies of the United States
Technology companies based in Greater Los Angeles
Companies based in Newport Beach, California
Loral Space & Communications
Manufacturing companies established in 1956
Technology companies established in 1956
Manufacturing companies disestablished in 1990
Technology companies disestablished in 1990
1956 establishments in California
1990 disestablishments in California
Defunct manufacturing companies based in Greater Los Angeles
Buildings and structures in Newport Beach, California
Buildings and structures completed in 1958
Demolished buildings and structures in California
William Pereira buildings